Liverpool Feds Women's Football Club is an English women's association football club based in Liverpool, Merseyside. They play their home games at the Jericho Lane Football Hub in Aigburth area of Liverpool.

History
The club were formed in 1991 and originated from the Liverpool Institute of Higher Education (now known as Liverpool Hope University) where they entered the North West Women's Regional Football League (NWWRFL). The name Feds originates from the Liverpool Institute of Higher Education College origins where the sports teams played as a Federation of the St Katherine's and Christ Notre Dame Colleges. In 1993 a reserve team was added, who during the 2019–20 season are playing in the NWWRFL, and in 1994 a girls youth section was created. They play their football in the Liverpool County FA Girls Leagues. A Development Squad and an under-18s team followed shortly afterwards.

The first team won promotion from the NWWRFL into the now-defunct Northern Combination Women's Football League in 2009 when they won the 2008–09 Premier Division title without losing a single game. They ended the campaign with a record of nineteen wins and three draws from twenty-two games played. They remained in the Northern Combination until 2014 when a major restructuring of the women's football pyramid saw the Combination leagues scrapped and the teams playing at that level moved into the new FA Women's Premier League (now known as the FA Women's National League) Division One, which was divided into four regional sections.

In the summer of 2015 Liverpool Feds linked up with the men's club Marshalls F.C. and changed their name to Liverpool Marshall Feds. This alliance lasted for three years, but in 2018 the women's club opted to break away and the word Marshall was dropped from the name of the club, reverting to their original name.

Ground
Liverpool Feds play their home games at the Jericho Lane Football Hub in Aigburth, having moved there from their previous home at the I M Marsh Campus of Liverpool John Moores University in 2018. The Jericho Lane site, which they share with South Liverpool F.C., was jointly developed by Liverpool City Council, the Liverpool County Football Association and The Football Association

Current squad

References

External links
Official club website

Women's football clubs in England
Sport in Liverpool
Football clubs in Liverpool
FA Women's National League teams